Skipper Voss is an American former bullfighter.

Life and career 
Voss began his career in 1963. He was a bullfighter at the National Finals Rodeo. He retired in bullfighting in 1978.

In 2015, Voss was inducted into the Bull Riding Hall of Fame.

References 

Living people
Year of birth missing (living people)
Place of birth missing (living people)
American bullfighters